Soavina is a town and commune in Madagascar. It belongs to the district of Ambatofinandrahana, which is a part of Amoron'i Mania Region. The population of the commune was 4,871 in 2018.

Primary and junior level secondary education are available in town. 98% of the communes population are farmers.  The most important crop is rice, while beans, maize and cassava are also significant crops. Services provide employment for 2% of the population.

References 

Populated places in Amoron'i Mania